Eurocard may be:
 Eurocard (printed circuit board), a European standard for printed circuit boards
 Eurocard (payment card), a European brand of charge cards